Executive Airlines, Inc. was a Puerto Rican-based regional airline headquartered at Luis Muñoz Marín International Airport in Carolina, Puerto Rico, the main airport for the United States territory, near the capitol of San Juan.  The airline was a wholly owned subsidiary of the AMR Corporation and it was paid by fellow AMR member American Airlines to staff, operate and maintain aircraft used on American Eagle flights that were scheduled, marketed and sold by American Airlines. Executive Airlines operated an extensive inter-island network in the Caribbean and the Bahamas from its hub in San Juan.

The airline was founded as Executive Air Charter in 1979, it joined the American Eagle system on September 15, 1986 as an independent airline, the company was purchased by AMR on December 7, 1989. In late 2007, AMR attempted to spin-off Executive Airlines, but the effort was unsuccessful. AMR eventually announced that it would close Executive Airlines on March 31, 2013.

The Executive Airlines name was also used by a U.S.-based commuter air carrier which operated scheduled passenger flights during the late 1960s and early 1970s in the northeast U.S. and Florida.

History 

The airline was founded by Puerto Rican businessman Joaquín Bolivar as Executive Air Charter in 1979, and on September 15, 1986 joined the American Eagle system as an independent airline operating code sharing flights on behalf of American Airlines.

The airline was purchased by the AMR Corporation, which at the time was the holding company of American Airlines and American Eagle Airlines.

In late 2007, it was announced AMR planned to spin-off American Eagle Airlines and Executive Airlines. In 2008, AMR said the spin-off plans had been put on hold until the airline industry stabilized after the worldwide financial crisis. In February 2008, Executive Airlines fleet of 12 ATR 72 turboprop aircraft were used to generate cash for the struggling AMR in a leaseback transaction.

On November 29, 2011, AMR Corporation filed for a Chapter 11 reorganization bankruptcy. Executive was forced to return its aircraft to the leasing company starting in 2012. As part of the changes during the AMR bankruptcy and merger with US Airways to form the American Airlines Group, the decision was made to close Executive Airlines on March 31, 2013. The airline's President and CEO, Pedro Fabregas would remain with the company and would become the President and CEO of American Eagle Airlines, which would be renamed Envoy Air.

Former destinations 
''Further information : American Eagle (airline brand) - (MQ) American Eagle Airlines / Envoy Destinations

Destinations served from the former American Airlines San Juan hub
Anguilla
The Valley (Clayton J. Lloyd International Airport)
Antigua and Barbuda
St. John's (VC Bird International Airport)
Aruba
Oranjestad (Queen Beatrix International Airport)
Barbados
Bridgetown (Grantley Adams International Airport)
Bonaire
Kralendijk (Flamingo International Airport)
British Virgin Islands
Tortola (Terrance B. Lettsome International Airport)
Virgin Gorda (Virgin Gorda Airport)
Curaçao
Willemstad (Curaçao International Airport)
Dominica
Roseau (Melville Hall Airport)
Dominican Republic
Barahona (María Montez International Airport)
La Romana (La Romana International Airport)
Puerto Plata (Gregorio Luperón International Airport)
Punta Cana (Punta Cana International Airport)
Samaná (Samaná El Catey International Airport)
Santiago (Cibao International Airport)
Santo Domingo (Herrera International Airport)
Santo Domingo (Las Américas International Airport)
France (Overseas departments)
Guadeloupe
Pointe-à-Pitre (Pointe-à-Pitre International Airport)
Martinique
Fort-de-France (Le Lamentin Airport)
Grenada
Saint George (Maurice Bishop International Airport)
Haiti
Port-au-Prince (Toussaint Louverture International Airport)
Puerto Rico
Mayagüez (Eugenio Maria de Hostos Airport)
Ponce (Mercedita Airport)
Saint Kitts and Nevis
Nevis (Vance W. Amory International Airport)
Saint Kitts (Robert L. Bradshaw International Airport, Basseterre)
Saint Lucia
Castries (George F. L. Charles Airport)
Saint Vincent and the Grenadines
Canouan (Canouan Airport)
Saint Vincent (E.T. Joshua Airport)
Sint Maarten
Philipsburg (Princess Juliana International Airport)
Trinidad and Tobago
Port of Spain (Piarco International Airport)
Tobago (Arthur Napoleon Raymond Robinson International Airport)
U.S. Virgin Islands
Saint Croix (Henry E. Rohlsen International Airport)
Saint Thomas (Cyril E. King Airport)

Fleet 
The Executive Air fleet consisted of the following aircraft (at February 2008):

Prior to transitioning to an all ATR 72 fleet, Executive Airlines operated ATR 42, CASA 212 and Short 360 turboprop aircraft.

Incidents and accidents 
 May 8, 1987: American Eagle Flight 5452, a CASA 212-200 was on a domestically scheduled passenger flight between San Juan, Puerto Rico-Mayaguez, Puerto Rico crashed short of Runway 09 while landing at Mayaguez. After impacting, the plane continued through a chain link fence and a ditch. Of the 6 occupants onboard (4 passengers and 2 crew on board) 2 were killed. The cause of the crash was determined to be the improper maintenance in setting the flight idle propeller and engine fuel flow.
 June 7, 1992: American Eagle Flight 5456, a CASA 212-200 was on a regular flight between San Juan, Puerto Rico and Mayaguez, Puerto Rico when it lost control and crashed nose-down about 3/4 mile from the Mayaguez, Puerto Rico airport. Both crew and all three passengers were killed. The cause of the crash was the copilot's inadvertent activation of the levers, causing the plane to lose control.
 May 9, 2004: an American Eagle ATR 72, flight 5401, crashed on landing in San Juan, Puerto Rico after the captain lost control of the aircraft while landing. 17 people were injured.

See also 
 List of defunct airlines of the United States

References 

 
Defunct airlines of Puerto Rico
American Airlines
Former Oneworld affiliate members
Aircraft ground handling companies
Aircraft ground handling
Defunct airlines of the United States
Defunct regional airlines of the United States
Companies that filed for Chapter 11 bankruptcy in 2011
Airlines established in 1986
Airlines disestablished in 2013